Ally Ridgers (born 30 June 1982) is a Scottish footballer who plays as a goalkeeper for Highland Football League side, Clachnacuddin. He is the brother of fellow goalkeepers Mark and William.

References

External links
Brora Rangers F.C. player profile

1982 births
Living people
Footballers from Inverness
Elgin City F.C. players
Clachnacuddin F.C. players
Inverness Caledonian Thistle F.C. players
Nairn County F.C. players
Brora Rangers F.C. players
Scottish Football League players
Scottish footballers
Association football goalkeepers
Highland Football League players